Catechase may refer to:

 catechol dioxygenase
 Catechol 1,2-dioxygenase
 Catechol 2,3-dioxygenase